This is a list of people elected Fellow of the Royal Society in 1946.

Fellows 
Agnes Arber
Wilson Baker
Sir George Lindor Brown
Sir Gordon Roy Cameron
Frank Dickens
Harry Julius Emeleus
Sir Frank Leonard Engledow
Edmund Brisco Ford
Robert Alexander Frazer
Sir Claude Dixon Gibb
Edward Armand Guggenheim
Robert Hill
Chalmers Jack Mackenzie
Sir Ernest Marsden
William George Penney, 1st Baron Penney of East Hendred
Sir John Turton Randall
Roderick Oliver Redman
Archibald Read Richardson
Louis Rosenhead
John Alexander Sinton
Harold Haydon Storey
Sir Harold Warris Thompson
John William Trevan
Lawrence Rickard Wager
Sir Francis Martin Rouse Walshe
Charles Maurice Yonge

Foreign members

Herbert Spencer Gasser
Jean Frederic Joliot
Theodore von Kármán
Erik Helge Oswald Stensiö

1946
1946 in science
1946 in the United Kingdom